Sabra Loomis (born 1938) is an Irish-American poet. Her most recent poetry collection is House Held Together by Winds (Harper Perennial, 2008), winner of the 2007 National Poetry Series. Her honors include Yaddo and MacDowell Colony fellowships. Her poems have appeared in literary journals and magazines including American Poetry Review, American Voice, Cincinnati Poetry Review, Cyphers, Florida Review, Heliotrope, Lumina, Negative Capability, Poetry Ireland Review, Salamander, Salt Hill Journal, and St. Ann's Review. She is the daughter of Alfred Loomis of Tuxedo Park, New York. She graduated from New York University. She teaches at the University of Massachusetts Boston, and was on the faculty of the Poets' House, Donegal. She divides her time between New York City, and Achill Island, Ireland.

Honors and awards
 2007 National Poetry Series
 Artists Foundation
 Yeats Society
 British Council
 Yaddo Fellowship
 MacDowell Colony Fellowship
 Virginia Center for the Creative Arts residency

Published works
Full-Length Poetry Collections
 
 

Chapbooks
 The Ship (Firm Ground Press, 2001)
 

Anthology Publications

Reviews
The house in House Held Together by Winds is both mansion and metaphor. Our docent for each construction is a little girl in a lace collar whose satirical observations of her dominating relatives expose the fears at the root of chauvinism....Readers who allow themselves to be voyeuristically fascinated by the gothic eccentricities of these poems will be moved by the transformation.

References

External links
 "Along the Quarry Road", Poetry Daily
 "Book of Hours", The San Francisco Jung Institute Library Journal, Winter 1990, Vol. 9, No. 1

1938 births
Living people
Loomis family
New York University alumni
University of Massachusetts Boston faculty
Poets from New York (state)
American women poets
American women academics
21st-century American women